David Jennings (1787–1834) was a United States Representative from Ohio from 1825 to 1826.

Biography 
Born in Readington Township, New Jersey, Jennings attended the public schools. He moved to St. Clairsville, Ohio, in 1812. He studied law, was admitted to the bar in 1813, and commenced practice in St. Clairsville. Jennings held several local offices, and served as prosecuting attorney of Belmont County from 1815 to 1825. He served as member of the State senate from 1819 to 1824.

Jennings was elected as a pro-Adams Republican to the Nineteenth Congress and served from March 4, 1825, until his resignation on May 25, 1826.

Death
He died in Baltimore, Maryland, in 1834.

References
 

1787 births
1834 deaths
Ohio state senators
People from St. Clairsville, Ohio
Ohio lawyers
National Republican Party members of the United States House of Representatives from Ohio
19th-century American politicians
19th-century American lawyers